The following teams took part in the Division III tournament which was held at Newcastle, Australia. The winner of the group was promoted to Division II for the 2012 championships, while the last-placed team in the group were relegated to Division IV, renamed Division IB and Division IIB respectively.  This tournament was the first at this level since 2008, and finished in dramatic style as the Netherlands won in a shootout.  The top two ranked teams (Australia and the Netherlands), were both undefeated until they played each other on the final day, with Julie Zwarthoed scoring the decisive goal.

Results

All times local (AEST/UTC+10)

Statistics

Scoring leaders 
GP = Games played; G = Goals; A = Assists; Pts = Points; +/− = Plus-minus; PIM = Penalties In MinutesSource: IIHF.com

Goaltending leaders 
(minimum 40% team's total ice time)

TOI = Time On Ice (minutes:seconds); GA = Goals against; GAA = Goals against average; Sv% = Save percentage; SO = ShutoutsSource: IIHF.com

Directorate Awards
Goaltender: Claudia van Leeuwen, 
Defenseman: Kitti Trencsényi, 
Forward: Natasha Farrier, 
Source: IIHF.com

References

External links 
 IIHF.com
 Complete results

III
2011